Edward Drax Free (1764–1843) was an English clergyman.

The youngest son of a clergyman, Edward Drax Free became a member of St John's College, Oxford, where he proceeded to the degrees of BA, MA, BD, and DD and was eventually elected to a Fellowship. He was also appointed Vicar of St Giles' Church, Oxford.

In Oxford he lived a very scandalous life and was on the verge of being sent down from St John's College when he was appointed Rector of the Church of All Saints, Sutton, Bedfordshire in 1808.

It is alleged that he stole the lead off his own church roof to sell for scrap. He also impregnated several of his housekeepers, allowed swine to desecrate the graveyard, and had been publicly abusive, both sober and drunk.

His downfall came when he attempted to have the churchwarden Montagu Burgoyne fined for non-attendance at church using a law passed during the reign of Elizabeth I. He was removed from his living at the parish in 1830.

He died in 1843 when a cart hit him in a road accident.

Further reading

R.B. Outhwaite, Scandal in the church: Dr Edward Drax Free, 1764-1843 (London: Hambledon Press, 1997)
Montagu Burgoyne, A letter from Montagu Burgoyne to his brother churchwardens in the diocese of Lincoln, giving a summary account of the prosecution, conviction, and deprivation of the rev. dr. Edward Drax Free (London: n.p., 1830)
Edward Drax Free, In his majesty's High court of delegates. The reverend Edward Drax Free against Montagu Burgoyne, an appeal from the Arches court of Canterbury (London: n.p., 1830)
"A Field Guide to the English Clergy' Butler-Gallie, F pp164/167: London, Oneworld Publications, 2018  </ref>

See also 
Harold Davidson

External links 
  Eddy Free
  More about Free

1764 births
1843 deaths
People from Sutton, Bedfordshire
19th-century English Anglican priests
Alumni of St John's College, Oxford
Fellows of St John's College, Oxford
Road incident deaths in England
Scandals in England